Top Secret is a 1967 Italian-Spanish Eurospy film  directed by Fernando Cerchio and starring  Gordon Scott.

Plot

Cast 

 Gordon Scott as John Sutton 
 Magda Konopka as Sandra Dubois 
 Aurora de Alba  as Zaira
Antonio Gradoli  as Von Klausen
Paco Morán 	 as Miguel  
Mirko Ellis as Hardy
Pietro Marascalchi 	 as Hans
Umberto Raho as Giorgio
Santiago Rivero 	 as Colonel Zikowsky

Reception
The Italian film critic Marco Giusti describes the film as "amusing, bizarre" and "full of genuine inventions and gags."

References

External links

1967 films
1960s spy thriller films
Italian spy thriller films
Spanish spy thriller films
Films directed by Fernando Cerchio
Films scored by Piero Umiliani
Films with screenplays by Tulio Demicheli
1960s Italian films
1960s Spanish films